Naserabad (also Romanized as Nāserābād) is a village in Deris Rural District, in the Central District of Kazerun County, Fars Province, Iran. At the 2016 census, its population was 1515, in 364 families.

References 

Populated places in Kazerun County